Diamond in the Firepit is the third studio album by the Finnish band Brother Firetribe, released in 2014. It's the band's first album after six years. A digital single, For Better or For Worse, was released as an advance copy. The album ranked #7 on the Finnish album chart in its first week.

Track list 
Intro – 00:21
Love Is Not Enough – 03:55
Far Away from Love – 04:14
For Better or for Worse – 04:10
Desperately – 04:17
Edge of Forever – 03:57
Hanging By a Thread – 05:15
Trail of Tears – 04:11
Winner Takes It All – 03:56 (cover of Sammy Hagar's song- soundtrack for the movie Over The Top – Giorgio Moroder, Tom Whitlock)
Tired of Dreaming – 04:27
Reality Bites – 03:56
Close To the Bone – 04:11

Lineup
Pekka Heino – vocals
Emppu Vuorinen – guitar
Tomppa Nikulainen – keyboard
Jason Flinck – bass, backing vocals
Kalle Torniainen – drums

References

2014 albums
Brother Firetribe albums
Spinefarm Records albums